Kacey Mottet Klein (born 20 October 1998) is a Swiss actor.

Life and career
Kacey Mottet Klein was born in Lausanne to an American father and a Swiss mother. He made his screen debut in 2008, in Ursula Meier's Home, for which he won the Swiss Film Award for Best Emerging Actor. In 2012, he appeared in the film Sister, which was his second collaboration with director Ursula Meier. His performance won him another Swiss Film Award and also a nomination for the César Award for Most Promising Actor. In 2016, he was given the Shooting Stars Award at the Berlin International Film Festival.

Filmography

References

External links

 

1998 births
Living people
Swiss male film actors
Swiss male child actors
21st-century Swiss male actors
People from Lausanne
Swiss people of American descent